Deh-e Geluband (also Romanized as Deh-e Gelūband) is a village in Kiskan Rural District, in the Central District of Baft County, Kerman Province, Iran. At the 2006 census, its population was 8, in 4 families.

References 

Populated places in Baft County